Capilla Real may refer to:

One of the Chapels Royal serving the king of Spain
Capilla Real de Granada, or its choir
Capilla Real de Madrid, or its choir